Independent Division of Xinjiang Military District(1st Formation) was formed in July 1966 from the Public Security Contingent of Xinjiang Uyghur Autonomous Region. The division was composed of three regiments (1st to 3rd).

On February 25, 1969, the division exchanged its designation and position with Independent Division of Qinghai Provincial Military District with all its remaining 3 regiments, and became the second formation of Independent Division of Qinghai Military District. All its regiments were renamed as follows:
1st Regiment (former 2nd);
3rd Regiment (former 3rd);
7th Regiment (former 1st).

As of October 26, 1970 the division was composed of 7 regiments.

In May 1976 the division was disbanded.

References

Infantry divisions of the People's Liberation Army
Military units and formations established in 1966
Military units and formations disestablished in 1976